West London Junction railway station served the city of London, England, in 1844 on the West London Railway.

History 
The station was opened on 27 May 1844 by the West London Railway. It was known as Great Western Junction in a notice issued by the London and Birmingham Railway. It was a very short-lived station, being open for six months before closing on 1 December 1844.

References 

Disused railway stations in London
Former London and North Western Railway stations
Former West London Railway stations
Railway stations in Great Britain opened in 1844
Railway stations in Great Britain closed in 1844
1844 establishments in England
1844 disestablishments in England